Sulsted is a small Danish town with a population of 1,524 (1 January 2022) situated in northern Jutland, 14 km north of Aalborg and 3 km north of the closest other town Vestbjerg.

Church 
Sulsted Church was constructed c. 1150-1200  and features a large number of frescos, all created in 1548 by Hans Maler from Randers.

Notable people 
 Knud Jespersen (1926 in Sulsted – 1977) a Danish politician, Chairman of the Communist Party of Denmark between 1958 and 1977

References

 
Cities and towns in the North Jutland Region
Towns and settlements in Aalborg Municipality